"We will bury you" is a phrase that was used by Soviet First Secretary Nikita Khrushchev while addressing Western ambassadors at a reception at the Polish embassy in Moscow on November 18, 1956. The phrase was originally translated into English by Khrushchev's personal interpreter Viktor Sukhodrev. The phrase was received very negatively by contemporary Western audiences, but modern translators have suggested the phrase was mistranslated or taken out of context.

History
While addressing the Western Bloc at the embassy on November 18, 1956, in the presence of communist Polish statesman Władysław Gomułka, First Secretary Khrushchev said: "About the capitalist states, it doesn't depend on you whether or not we exist. If you don't like us, don't accept our invitations, and don't invite us to come to see you. Whether you like it or not, history is on our side. We will bury you!" The speech prompted the envoys from twelve NATO nations and Israel to leave the room.

During Khrushchev's visit to the United States in 1959, the Los Angeles mayor Norris Poulson in his address to Khrushchev stated: "We do not agree with your widely quoted phrase 'We shall bury you.' You shall not bury us and we shall not bury you. We are happy with our way of life. We recognize its shortcomings and are always trying to improve it. But if challenged, we shall fight to the death to preserve it". Many Americans meanwhile interpreted Khrushchev's quote as a nuclear threat.

In another public speech Khrushchev declared: "We must take a shovel and dig a deep grave, and bury colonialism as deep as we can". In a 1961 speech at the Institute of Marxism–Leninism in Moscow, Khrushchev said that "peaceful coexistence" for the Soviet Union means "intense, economic, political and ideological struggle between the proletariat and the aggressive forces of imperialism in the world arena". Later, on August 24, 1963, Khrushchev remarked in his speech in Yugoslavia, "I once said, 'We will bury you,' and I got into trouble with it. Of course we will not bury you with a shovel. Your own working class will bury you," a reference to the Marxist saying, "The proletariat is the undertaker of capitalism" (in the Russian translation of Marx, the word "undertaker" is translated as a "grave digger",) based on the concluding statement in Chapter 1 of  the Communist Manifesto: "What the bourgeoisie therefore produces, above all, are its own grave-diggers. Its fall and the victory of the proletariat are equally inevitable". In his memoirs, Khrushchev stated that "enemy propaganda picked up the slogan and blew it all out of proportion".

Some authors suggest that an alternative translation is "We shall be present at your funeral" or "We shall outlive you". Authors have suggested the phrase, in conjunction with Khrushchev's overhead hand clasp gesture meant that Russia would take care of the funeral arrangements for capitalism after its demise.

First Secretary Khrushchev was known for his emotional public image. His daughter admitted that "he was known for strong language, interrupting speakers, banging his fists on the table in protest, pounding his feet, even whistling". She called such behavior a "manner, which suited his goal... to be different from the hypocrites of the West, with their appropriate words but calculated deeds". Mikhail Gorbachev suggested in his book Perestroika and New Thinking for Our Country and the World that the image used by Khrushchev was inspired by the acute discussions among Soviet agrarian scientists in the 1930s, nicknamed "who will bury whom", the bitterness of which can only be understood in the political context of the times.

In popular culture
 Khrushchev's phrase was used as the title of Jan Šejna's book on communist Cold War strategies, a 1962 documentary We'll Bury You.
 The phrase appears in Sting's song "Russians" (1985).
 In the opening scene of the 2020 film The Courier, Khrushchev closes his speech with the same words.

See also
 Kuzma's mother
 Shoe-banging incident

References

External links 
 

1950s neologisms
1956 in international relations
1956 in Moscow
1956 in the Soviet Union
1956 speeches
Cold War speeches
Diplomatic incidents
Foreign relations of the Soviet Union
Speeches by Nikita Khrushchev
November 1956 events
Russian political phrases
Soviet phraseology
Soviet Union–United States relations